Mariano I may refer to:

 Mariano I di Zori (11th century)
 Mariano I de Lacon-Gunale (died after 18 March 1082)